Anna Vyacheslavovna Styazhkina (born 5 June 1997) is a Russian chess player. She received the FIDE title of Woman International Master (WIM) in  2013 and won the under 10 girls' section of the World Youth Chess Championship in 2007 and the under 16 girls' in 2012.
She was the runner-up at the World U12 Girls' Championship in 2009 and at the World U14 Girls' Championship in 2011.

Chess career 
Styazhkina also won the U12 Girls' division of the European Youth Chess Championship in 2008 and the U16 Girls' in 2013. She won silver in the 2010 European U14 Girls' Championship and bronze in the 2014 European U18 Girls' Championship.

She played for "Peter Rook 1" team that took first place in the 2015 Russian Youth Team Championship. In this competition she also won the prize for the best female player, thanks to her 8.5/9 score and a 2485 performance rating.

In 2016, she won the Women's Saint Petersburg Chess Championship.

She comes from a chess family: her father Viacheslav is an International Master and Peter Svidler's first trainer, and her mother Olga is a Woman Grandmaster.

References

External links 
 
 
 

1997 births
Living people
Russian female chess players
Chess Woman International Masters
World Youth Chess Champions